Meh is an English interjection expressing indifference or boredom.

MEH or meh may refer to:

Music 
"@ Meh", a 2020 single by rapper Playboi Carti
 "Meh", another 2020 song by the rapper on Whole Lotta Red

Science and technology 
 Multiple-effect humidification, a seawater desalination method
 Microsomal epoxide hydrolase, an intestinal enzyme

Other uses 
 National Security Service (Turkey)
 Mehamn Airport, Norway (IATA code: MEH)
 Nuyoo Mixtec, a language spoken in Mexico (ISO 639-3 code: meh)
 meh.com, an experimental e-commerce site